Joe Curran may refer to:

Pat Curran (footballer, born 1917) aka Joe Curran
Joe Curran, protagonist in Joe (1970 film)
Joe Curran (ice hockey), plays in Atlantic Coast Hockey League

See also
Joseph Curran (disambiguation)